Arcticfox is a science fiction tank simulation video game developed by Dynamix and published by Electronic Arts in 1986. It was published in Europe by Ariolasoft. A sequel to Dynamix's Stellar 7, Arcticfox was developed for the Amiga as one of the platform's first titles but was quickly ported to other platforms including the Atari ST, Commodore 64, ZX Spectrum, MS-DOS and Apple II. A third game was released in the series in 1991 titled Nova 9: The Return of Gir Draxon.

The game is set in a fictional 2005 where aliens have taken over Antarctica in an attempt to steal the Earth's oxygen. The player is sent to eradicate the intruders using a new super tank codenamed Arcticfox.

Arcticfoxs design team at Dynamix went on to produce The Incredible Machine and Red Baron.

Gameplay

The player must pilot the tank into enemy territory with the goal of knocking out the alien base. The player uses the tank's abilities to destroy the aliens' ships and equipment. The Arcticfox tank is equipped with a cannon, guided missiles, land mines, and is outfitted with radar, a GPS device, and fore and aft viewscreens. The player fights a variety of enemy units including planes, tanks, bunkers and communication towers.

The vantage point for the game is the cockpit of the Arcticfox tank. The player can see out of the main viewscreen as well as the tank's sundry features such as the radar screen. The view also shows the character's hand on the joystick which moves in accordance with the tank's movements. Enemy targets are visible on the view screens and on radar.

Reception
Computer Gaming World called Arcticfox "the first original new [EA game] that uses the distinctive features of the Amiga", calling the graphics and sound "Sensational!". It advised using a joystick instead of the mouse. In 1996, the magazine ranked the Amiga version of Arcticfox as the 138th best game of all time, calling it "the seminal 3D polygon-based shooter." Compute! also praised the Amiga version, and stated that the game would appeal to those who enjoyed both strategy and arcade action. "If you could buy only one game for your Atari ST, it might be Arctic Fox", Antic said, concluding that it was "a game you will return to play time and time again". Info magazine gave the Commodore 64 version four-plus stars out of five, praising its "great 3-D graphics", "intuitive control interface", and control over missiles. The staff of Crash magazine were critical of the ZX Spectrum version of the game, giving it an overall score of 41%.

See also
Skyfox (1984), EA's first game with the "fox" suffix. The sequel, Skyfox II, was developed by Dynamix.

References

External links
Arcticfox at MobyGames
Arcticfox at the Amiga Hall of Light
Arcticfox at Atari Mania

1986 video games
Amiga games
Apple II games
Ariolasoft games
Atari ST games
Commodore 64 games
DOS games
Electronic Arts games
Science fiction video games
Tank simulation video games
Video games set in 2005
Video games set in Antarctica
ZX Spectrum games
Dynamix games
Single-player video games